Le Mans Sarthe Basket, commonly known as MSB or Le Mans, is a professional basketball club that is from the city of Le Mans, France. The team plays in the French League and internationally in the Basketball Champions League.

History

The Modern Sport Club (1939–1993)

In 1928, French businessmen, Léopold Gouloumés arrived at the city Mans and founded the food association: the Société des Comptoirs Modernes. Like many other industries at the time, him and Bernard Gasnal, founded their own sport club called Goulou Club in 1938. But in September 1939 the Second World War broke out and the men were needed to fight. With the male absent, women decided to persuade the Goulou Club into creating a basketball team for them.

In 1941, the French government prohibited sport clubs to use the name of an industry so the Goulou Club changed its name to Modern Sporting Club.

In 1952, Le Mans frills won the title of champions of France. Then following that success Bernard Gasnal founded a men's team. In 1963 the team joined the elite.

The following years from 1969 to 1970 was very successful, they won the French Cup in 1964 and the French League championship in 1978 and 1979.

After the euphoria of the European games, the club was struggling to survive due to the rising dominance of CSP Limoges and Pau-Orthez

The SCM existed after the MSB was created and was concerned about the amateur part of the association.

In continuation (since 2008)

The 2008–2009 season will be more prosperous for the club. In addition to a third place in the regular season followed by a semi-final playoffs (defeated against Orleans), the MSB makes a superb double in gleaning the week of "As" (74-64 victory facing Orleans in the final) then the French Cup (79-65 victory against Nancy in the Final at Bercy). Best of all, Alain Koffi, whom formed the club, is elected the French MVP of the season. However, in Euroleague, the MSB finished again last in their group with two thin victories in ten games.

Despite the departure of several executives in the off season such as Alain Koffi or Nicolas Batum, the MSB plays always the leading roles in the league in 2009 – 2010 because after having a long time to be the first of the regular season, the club finally finished behind Cholet. The two teams meet in the championship final, but Cholet wins the derby at the top (81-65). Le Mans compete in the Eurocup but are eliminated on the wire in the first round. In 2014, the MSB won the Cup leaders.

Since 21 May in 2014, the MSB has been trained by Turkish Erman Kunter, former coach of Cholet. He took over succession from JD Jackson.
The season is mixed, particularly marked by a heavy defeat in the derby home against Cholet Basket (61-82). Committed in Eurochallenge, the MSB won their first two games against the Belgians from Antwerp Giants (72-66) and Finland KTP Basket (71-52) before a heavy on the floor of Pallacanestro Biella, Italian D2 club ( 82–64).

The club and the society

The company was founded on September 6, 1993 as a Society of Mixed Economy Sports Local and chaired until June 30, 2008 by Jean-Pierre Goisbault. Christophe Le Bouille became president on July 1, 2008. In 2007 The company had a budget of 5.5 million euros.

Furthermore, another structure dedicated to marketing, is also under the name of MSB Promotion. It is she who is responsible for the communication around the club's image.

The coat of arms, the colors, and the supporters
The jersey worn by the players are tango and gray. Tango is inherited from the ancient Moderne Sporting Club.

The logo has existed since 1993 and the acquisition of the new professional status of the team. It uses the colors of the club, accompanied by three letters MSB (acronym of Le Mans Sarthe Basket) written in white. In the summer of 2009, the MSB changed the coat of arms and opted for a lion showing claws and out of the logo, symbol of the feline. The addition of an animal blasonnant the team who follow the custom of other French teams like Pau Orthez and Nancy.

The official group of supporters are called the felines. This exists in the form of an association and follows the club on certain displacements. They even give a reward to the most outstanding players called the reflection feline.

Derby History

The western derby opposes the two best clubs in the north west of France. Since 1986, it opposed every season of the Le Mans team to that of Cholet, located in Maine-et-Lorie. Since their first encounter in N1B male division, the two teams met regularly. They deliver from the 1990–91 season, a diligent and annual duel. That makes twenty years that the two teams have met each season. The former North West derby was more "balanced" and opposed the SC Le Mans at ABC Nantes. The two teams are in particular the two favorites of the trophy, Sarthe Pays de la Loire Basketball where often a first division outsider is invited.

Honours
LNB Pro A
Champions (5): 1978, 1979, 1982, 2006, 2018

French Cup
Champions (4): 1964, 2004, 2009, 2016

Leaders Cup
Champions (3): 2006, 2009, 2014

Rennes, France Invitational Game
Winners (1): 2008
Bourg en Bresse Invitational Tournament
Champions (1): 2009

Season by season

Players

Current roster

Notable players

 Pape Badiane
 Nicolas Batum
 Rodrigue Beaubois
 Yannick Bokolo
 Antoine Diot
 Hervé Dubuisson
 Youssoupha Fall
 Mickaël Gelabale
 Charles Kahudi
 Alain Koffi
 Lahaou Konaté
 Jérémy Leloup
 Thierry Rupert
 Pape Sy
 Will Yeguete
 Jonathan Tabu
 Mouphtaou Yarou
 Zack Wright
 João Paulo Batista
 Olivier Hanlan
 J.D. Jackson
 Pape-Philippe Amagou
 Sandro Nicević
 Mate Skelin
 Gerald Lee
 Taurean Green
 Michalis Kakiouzis
 David Bluthenthal
 Ido Kozikaro
 Raviv Limonad
 Richard Hendrix
 Romeo Travis
 Nebojša Bogavac
 Justin Cobbs
 Taylor Rochestie
 Obi Emegano
 Michał Ignerski
 Luka Bogdanović
 Marko Kešelj
 Hüseyin Beşok
 Bobby Dixon
 İzzet Türkyılmaz
 Alex Acker
 Eric Campbell
 Brian Chase
 Sam Clancy
 Cameron Clark
 Robert Dozier
 Khalid El-Amin
 Daniel Ewing
 Kenny Gregory
 Jermaine Guice
 Dennis Hopson
 Keith Jennings
 Chris Lofton
 Ryan Pearson
 Hollis Price
 Mykal Riley
 Marc Salyers
 D.J. Stephens
 Dewarick Spencer
 D.J. Stephens
 Michael Thompson
 Darius Washington
 DaShaun Wood
 Cuthbert Victor

Head coaches
 André Buffière
 Bill Sweek
 Vincent Collet
 J. D. Jackson
  Erman Kunter

External links
 Official website
 Le Mans at Eurobasket.com
 Le Mans at Keyhoops.com
 Le Mans at Euroleague.net

LeMans
Basketball teams established in 1939
Sport in Le Mans
1939 establishments in France